is a town located in Kushiro Subprefecture, Hokkaido, Japan. As of September, 2013, it has an estimated population of 8,910, and an area of 773.74 km². The population has fallen significantly in recent years.

Etymology 
It is believed that the town's name, which is in the indigenous Ainu language, translates roughly into "the place where the tide passes over the rocky shore".

History 
During the Meiji restoration, Japanese people were encouraged by the central government to inhabit the lands of Hokkaido. Shiranuka was thus founded as a small fishing village in 1884, eventually gaining town status in 1950.

Geography 
Situated at the mouth of the river Charo into the Pacific Ocean, Shiranuka is flanked on both sides by small hills and has two narrow stretches of sand beaches.

Climate 
The town has a typically Northern-temperate climate. Winter temperates reach a minimum of around −10 °C, climbing to a maximum of around 20 °C in summer. Snowfall tends to be slightly lower than the rest of Hokkaido, and the local region is known for a high proportion of overcast or foggy days.

Economy 
Shiranuka is historically a fishing and farming town: many of its inhabitants are still employed in those areas. Local amenities and the civil service also provide a number of jobs.

Education 
Shiranuka has a number of kindergartens, an elementary school, a junior high school and a high school. Many junior school students opt to go to high school in Kushiro. The town board of education also covers schools in nearby Shoro and Charo villages.

Cuisine 
Like Hokkaido as a whole, perhaps Shiranuka's greatest claim to fame is its culinary offerings. The town has a large population of Sika deer, which are consequently something of a local delicacy along with the sea produce brought in by local fishermen.

Transport links 
Shiranuka is linked to nearby Kushiro by road Route 38, as well as regular bus and train services. A regular train from Shiranuka reaches Sapporo in just under 4 hours; Nemuro and Obihiro are both roughly 2-hour train journeys away.

Tourism 
Although not a common tourist destination in itself, Shiranuka is well placed for nearby attractions. Kushiro wetlands have become famous in Japan since the recovery of the crane population, and Akan National Park is approximately an hours drive from the town. Shiretoko National Park (one of Japan's three World Natural Heritage Sites) is slightly further, but still accessible within 3 hours by car.

Mascots 

They met in Shiranuka Koitoi Michi-no-Eki.
Koita is a red willow octopus from Shiranuka. 
Meika is a white flying squid from Kyushu.

References

External links 

 Official Website 

Towns in Hokkaido